Johan Svantesson (born 13 September 1992) is a Swedish footballer who plays for Melbourne University Soccer Club in the Victorian State League Division 3 in Australia.

References

External links
 (archive)

1992 births
Living people
Association football forwards
Gefle IF players
Allsvenskan players
Swedish footballers